Munakata Saikaku (宗像 才鶴) was a Japanese female samurai warlord, aristocrat and onna-musha of the Sengoku period. She was the wife of Munakata Ujisada, the last Munakata clan daiguji of Munakata Shrine in Chikuzen province of the Kyushu island. After her husband's death in 1586, she was appointed leader of the Munataka clan by Japan's most powerful man at the time, Toyotomi Hideyoshi. She played a crucial role in the Kyushu campaign, her achievements in battles were noted and she became a female lord.

Toyotomi Hideyoshi, one of the three ''Japan's Great unifier'', sent letters to Munakata Saikaku of the Munakata clan, famed for producing successive generations of "daiguji," the highest-ranking priest of Munakata Taisha shrine. Saikaku was the wife of Ujisada, the last daiguji of the Shinto shrine, which is a part of a UNESCO World Heritage site.

The letter sent by Hideyoshi, congratulated her on her military achievements during her fight against the Shimazu clan in the Kyushu Campaign. Because of her conquests in battle, Hideyoshi appointed her as the head of the Munakata clan.

Hideyoshi's letter 
The letter was discovered on September 18, 2019, attracting the attention of several people because of a peculiar fact in Japanese history: A woman being appointed as head of a clan by a powerful feudal lord. The two rare letters, one a "hanmotsu" official document signed with Hideyoshi's "kao" stylized signature, and a "shuinjo" letter with a red seal, were handed down through successive generations of the Munakata clan, which served the ruling Hosokawa clan of the Higo Domain.

Munakata Ujisada died suddenly in 1586, a year before Hideyoshi conquered the Kyushu region. Hideyoshi praises the Munakata clan for preventing the Shimazu clan, which was in southern Kyushu, from going north. In gratitude, he issued "hanmotsu" that same year, ensuring that the clan can maintain its territories.

In the "shuinjo", the warlord instructs the Munakata clan to consult with his vassal, Asano Nagamasa, before sending troops to Kyoto. Both letters were addressed to Saikaku, showing that Hideyoshi acknowledged her as head of the Munakata clan. Although Saikaku is mentioned as the female lord of the Munakata clan in letters passed down to other samurai families, little had been known about her life and fate.

See also 
 List of female castellans in Japan

References 

Japanese women in warfare
Women of medieval Japan
16th-century Japanese women
Women in 16th-century warfare
16th-century women rulers
16th-century women politicians
People of Sengoku-period Japan
Sengoku period